Taiwan Wild Bird Federation or TWBF is Taiwan's largest bird conservation organization and represents 21 groups throughout Taiwan and its outlying islands.

The official TWBF bird as well as the bird depicted on the logo is the Mikado pheasant, a species endemic to the mountainous regions of Taiwan.

History 
1988: Wild Bird Society of the Republic of China was established in Taiwan by a group of wild bird enthusiasts.
1994: became a Partner Designate of BirdLife International.
1996: became an Official Partner of BirdLife International.
2001: the English name was renamed to Wild Bird Federation Taiwan.
2008: the English name was renamed to Chinese Wild Bird Federation due to repeated pressure from People's Republic of China to BirdLife International
2020: on 7 September 2020 CWBF was voted out of BirdLife International due to pressure from People's Republic of China. The English name was subsequently renamed to Taiwan Wild Bird Federation on 19 September 2020 "to avoid international confusion and allow us to expand ties with other groups in promoting the important work of global conservation."

Mission 
The purpose of TWBF is to protect wild birds and its natural habitats through appreciation, research and conservation.

Programs 
TWBF conducts bird population surveys and migration research in conjunction with local and international organizations.
 Checklist of the Birds of Taiwan, updated every three years. The publication is the most comprehensive checklist of birds found in Taiwan and covers all land areas under Taiwan's administration, including outlying islands.
 Black-faced Spoonbill Global Census is a simultaneous survey of black-faced spoonbill's wintering population initiated by the Hong Kong Bird Watching Society in coordination with bird societies in the region including South Korea, Japan, China, Macau, Thailand, Cambodia, and Taiwan.
 Taiwan Bird Banding Program is administered by TWBF and provides management and support of bird ringing in Taiwan for academia and citizen research groups.

TWBF organizes several citizen science projects including the following.
 Taiwan New Year Bird Count, an annual community bird count to record wintering birds in Taiwan and its outlying islands.
 eBird Taiwan, administered jointly by TWBF and Taiwan's Endemic Species Research Institute.

The group publishes Feather, a quarterly bilingual online magazine on bird-related issues.

Organization 
TWBF is composed of 18 local bird associations and 3 ecology conservation groups.

Local Bird Associations 
 Kaohsiung Wild Bird Society
 Wild Bird Association of Taiwan
 Wild Bird Society of Chang Hwa
 Wild Bird Society of Chia-Yi County
 Wild Bird Society of Chiayi
 Wild Bird Society of Hsinchu
 Wild Bird Society of Hualien
 Wild Bird Society of I-Lan
 Wild Bird Society of Keelung
 Wild Bird Society of Kinmen
 Wild Bird Society of Matsu
 Wild Bird Society of Nantou County
 Wild Bird Society of Ping-tung
 Wild Bird Society of Tainan
 Wild Bird Society of Taipei
 Wild Bird Society of Taitung County
 Wild Bird Society of Taoyuan
 Wild Bird Society of Yun-Lin

Ecology Groups 
 Kaohsiung Jiading Ecology and Cultural Association
 Meinung People's Association
 Miaoli Nature Ecology Society

References

External links 
 

Ornithological organizations
Environmental organizations established in 1988
Bird conservation organizations